In geometry, the order-8 hexagonal tiling is a regular tiling of the hyperbolic plane. It has Schläfli symbol of {6,8}.

Uniform constructions 
There are four uniform constructions of this tiling, three of them as constructed by mirror removal from the [8,6] kaleidoscope. Removing the mirror between the order 2 and 6 points, [6,8,1+], gives [(6,6,4)], (*664). Removing the mirror between the order 8 and 6 points, [6,1+,8], gives (*4232). Removing two mirrors as [6,8*], leaves remaining mirrors (*33333333).

Symmetry 
This tiling represents a hyperbolic kaleidoscope of 4 mirrors meeting as edges of a square, with eight squares around every vertex. This symmetry by orbifold notation is called (*444444) with 6 order-4 mirror intersections. In Coxeter notation can be represented as [8,6*], removing two of three mirrors (passing through the square center) in the [8,6] symmetry.

Related polyhedra and tiling

See also

Uniform tilings in hyperbolic plane
List of regular polytopes

References

 John H. Conway, Heidi Burgiel, Chaim Goodman-Strass, The Symmetries of Things 2008,  (Chapter 19, The Hyperbolic Archimedean Tessellations)

External links 

 Hyperbolic and Spherical Tiling Gallery
 KaleidoTile 3: Educational software to create spherical, planar and hyperbolic tilings
 Hyperbolic Planar Tessellations, Don Hatch

Hexagonal tilings
Hyperbolic tilings
Isogonal tilings
Isohedral tilings
Order-8 tilings
Regular tilings